Terese is the name of the following people:

Terese Berceau (born 1950), member of the Wisconsin State Assembly
Terese Capucilli, American modern dancer
Therese Forster (1786–1862), German educator and writer
Teresė Nekrošaitė (born 1961), Lithuanian javelin thrower
Terese Nielsen (born 1966), American fantasy artist
Terese Pedersen (born 1980), Norwegian handball goalkeeper
Terese Svoboda, American author

See also
Teresa